The 2019 Tibor Zsíros Férfi Magyar Kupa was the 62nd season of the Hungarian Basketball Cup. Szilárd Benke was named Most Valuable Player.

Qualification
Eight highest ranked teams after the first half of the 2018–19 NB I/A regular season qualified to the tournament.

Szolnoki Olaj KK
Egis Körmend
Falco-Vulcano Energia KC Szombathely
JP Auto-JKSE
Zalakerámia ZTE KK
Pécsi VSK-VEOLIA
Atomerőmű SE
DEAC

Bracket

Quarterfinals

Semifinals

Bronze match

Final

Final standings

See also
 2018–19 Nemzeti Bajnokság I/A

References

External links
 Official website
 Hungarian Basketball Federaration
 bb1.hu

Magyar Kupa men